La mia storia con te is the seventh single of Alessandra Amoroso. It's the single launch for the second album (not EP) of Alessandra Amoroso, Il mondo in un secondo.

Track listing
Digital download

The song
After the formalization of the publication of the second album by Alessandra Amoroso, Il mondo in un secondo, occurred on July 15, 2010, the official Facebook page of Alessandra Amoroso organized on August 27, 2010, an event through which, solving riddles, Alessandra Amoroso's fans have been able to discover the title of the single.
On August 30, 2010 Sony BMG published digitally the cover of the single and announced the date of the release of La mia storia con te and Il mondo in un second. The song was released a preview on the official website of Alessandra Amoroso on August 31, 2010. For the occasion, the site's graphics was changed and several previously unpublished content were added. 
On September 1, 2010 the single was made available for digital download at iTunes, while on September 2, 2010 in all the others digital stores. From September 3, 2010 the song started being broadcast on radio.
The theme of this ballad is a love relationship which is probably ending and the whole piece focuses on the reflections caused by the crisis of this love and the will to continue this love from the singer.
The song was written by Saverio Grandi, Fabio Campedelli, Luca Angelosanti e Marco Ciappelli and produced by Dado Parisini.

The music video
The shooting for the videoclip took place on August 31, 2010 in Barcelona, Spain. The video was first published on September 16, 2010 on Sky One. The video was produced by BlackMamba Productions and directed by Basile & Jansen.

Charts

Weekly charts

Year-end charts

Sources

External links
 La mia storia con te live @ Un'Estate Senza Nuvole Live Tour

Alessandra Amoroso songs
2010 singles
Pop ballads
Italian-language songs
Songs written by Marco Ciappelli
Epic Records singles
2010 songs